Fazisi Stadium is a multi-use stadium in Poti, Georgia.  It is used mostly for football matches and is the home stadium of FC Kolkheti-1913 Poti. The stadium is able to hold 6,000 people.

Sports venues in Georgia (country)
Football venues in Georgia (country)
Poti
Buildings and structures in Samegrelo-Zemo Svaneti